Belize–Mexico relations are the diplomatic relations between Belize and Mexico. Both nations are members of the Association of Caribbean States, Community of Latin American and Caribbean States, Organization of American States and the United Nations.

History 

The Yucatán Peninsula, today divided between the nations of Belize, Guatemala and Mexico; was once home to the Mayan civilization. In the 16th century, Spain invaded the territory and administered the land from Mexico City, seat of the Viceroyalty of New Spain. After Spanish conquest, the territory that would later be known as Belize was poorly administered and open to attacks from pirates. In the 17th century, British settlers began arriving to Belize and fought several battles to control the territory. In the late 18th century, the United Kingdom formally took over the territory of Belize. In July 1893, newly independent Mexico signed a treaty with the United Kingdom setting borders between the two nations, which is still in place today.

On 21 September 1981, Belize became an independent nation. That same day, Belize and Mexico established diplomatic relations with Mexico establishing the first embassy in the country, while the United Kingdom established a High Commission. In 1982, Belizean Prime Minister George Price became the first head of state from Belize to pay an official visit to Mexico. In 1986, Belize opened its embassy in Mexico City. In 1988, Mexican President Miguel de la Madrid became the first Mexican head of state to pay an official visit to Belize. Since then, there have been several high-level visits between heads of states from both nations. In 2016, both nations celebrated 35 years of diplomatic relations.

In May 2022, Mexican President Andrés Manuel López Obrador paid an official visit to Belize.

High-level visits
Prime Ministerial visits from Belize to Mexico

 Prime Minister George Cadle Price (1982, 1983)
 Prime Minister Manuel Esquivel (1985, 1993, 1994, 1995, 1997)
 Prime Minister Said Musa (1999, 2000, 2004, 2006, 2007)
 Prime Minister Dean Barrow (2010, 2012)
 Prime Minister Johnny Briceño (2021)

Presidential visits from Mexico to Belize

 President Miguel de la Madrid Hurtado (1988)
 President Carlos Salinas de Gortari (1991)
 President Vicente Fox (2005)
 President Felipe Calderón (2007)
 President Enrique Peña Nieto (2017)
 President Andrés Manuel López Obrador (2022)

Bilateral agreements
Both nations have signed several bilateral agreements such as an Agreement of Territorial Limits of British Honduras signed between Mexico and the United Kingdom (1893); Postal Agreement (1910); Agreement of Cultural Exchanges (1982); Agreement on the Execution of Criminal Judgments (1986); Agreement of Cooperation in Combating Drug Trafficking and Drug Dependency (1990); Agreement of Cooperation in the Preservation and Maintenance of Archaeological Zones (1990); Agreement of Tourism Cooperation (1990); Agreement for the Protection and Restitution of Archaeological, Artistic and Historical Monuments (1991); Agreement for the Protection and Improvement of the Environment and Conservation of Natural Resources in the Border Zone (1991); Agreement of Scientific and Technical Cooperation (1995) and an Agreement on Exchange of Information on Tax Matters (2011).

Transportation and border crossings
There are direct flights between both nations with Tropic Air. There are also several border crossings along the Belize–Mexico border.

Trade
In 2018, trade between Belize and Mexico totaled US$138 million. Belize's main exports to Mexico include: shrimp and crustaceans; motors; machinery parts and scrap metal. Mexico's main exports to Belize include: electric energy; textiles; cement and parts for the cement industry.  In 2016, Mexican direct investment totaled US$250 million while Belizean investment to Mexico amounted to US$2.2 million. Mexico is Belize's second largest trading partner globally. Mexican multinational companies Cemex and Rotoplas operate in Belize.

Resident diplomatic missions
 Belize has an embassy in Mexico City.
 Mexico has an embassy in Belmopan and a consular section in Belize City.

See also
 Belize–Mexico border

References 

 
Mexico
Bilateral relations of Mexico